This is a list of members of the Riksdag, the national parliament of Sweden. The Riksdag is a unicameral assembly with 349 members of parliament, who are elected on a proportional basis to serve fixed terms of four years. In the Riksdag, members are seated per constituency and not party. The following MPs were elected in the 1998 Swedish general election.

Notes

1998 in Sweden
1999 in Sweden
2000 in Sweden
2001 in Sweden
2002 in Sweden
1998-2002
List